Salma Agha (born 29 October 1954) is a British singer and actress who worked in Pakistani and Indian films in the 1980s and the early 1990s. She was born in Karachi and raised in London, where she received several film offers from Indian directors. Her first film was the romance Nikaah (1982), in which she starred as the female lead and also sang several of the film's songs herself. She was nominated for the Filmfare awards that year in both the Best Actress category and the Best Female Playback Singer category. It was for her singing that she won the Filmfare Best Female Playback Award. She is also known for her role in Kasam Paida Karne Wale Ki (1984) opposite Mithun Chakraborty, and for her song "Come Closer" from the same film.

Personal life
Salma Agha was born and raised in Karachi, Sindh, Pakistan, to Liaqat Gul Agha and his wife Nasreen Agha. Liaqat Gul Agha was a tradesman dealing in rugs and belonged to an Urdu speaking Pathan Muslim family based in Amritsar, East Punjab. She traces the origin of her surname 'Aagha', "Her father (Liaqat Gul Tajik) traded in precious stones and antiques in Iran. He was given the title Aagha there, a kind of knighthood bestowed on a businessman of repute." Her mother Nasreen (born as Zarina Ghaznavi) was the daughter of Rafiq Ghaznavi, a Pashtun musician, and his wife Anwari Bai Begum, who was one of the earliest actresses of Indian cinema, starring in Heer Ranjha (1932). Anwari and Rafiq Ghaznavi separated after Nasreen's birth, and Anwari then married a rich Indian Hindu businessman named Jugal Kishore Mehra, who converted to Islam and took the name Ahmed Salman. Jugal Kishore Mehra was a first cousin of Bollywood actors Raj Kapoor, Shammi Kapoor and Shashi Kapoor, because their mother, Ramsarni Mehra (née Kapoor), was the sister of his father.

Salma Agha was in a relationship in the 1980s with London-based businessman Ayaz Sipra. This relationship lasted many years, during which time Salma made her film debut, but it did not develop into marriage. She has been married three times. Her first husband was Javed Sheikh in the 1980s. She was then married to the squash player Rahmat Khan from 1989 to 2010 and they have two children together – Zara "Sasha" Agha Khan and Ali Agha Khan (Liaqat Ali Khan). In 2011, she married Manzar Shah, a Dubai-based businessman. She lives in Mumbai, where her daughter Sasha works in Bollywood films. In January 2017, she was granted Overseas Citizenship of India status by the Indian government.

Filmography

Discography

References

External links

FilmfareAwards
Salma Agha to raise funds for Indian hockey – Times Of India

Living people
1956 births
Nigar Award winners
20th-century British actresses
Women ghazal singers
Actresses from London
Singers from London
English film actresses
English women singers
English people of Pakistani descent
Naturalised citizens of the United Kingdom
Filmfare Awards winners
British expatriate actresses in India
European actresses in India
Actresses in Hindi cinema
British people of Pakistani descent
Khan family (squash)
20th-century Pakistani women singers
20th-century English women
20th-century English people